Zlata Adamovská (born March 9, 1959) is a Czech actress. Born in Prague, she has starred in a number of films and TV series including Sanitka and Noc smaragdového měsíce, which was entered into the 35th Berlin International Film Festival. Since 1990, she has been a member of the ensemble at the Vinohrady Theatre. In December 2018 she agreed to play a role in an upcoming film Women on the Run. There, she plays the role of Vera, a woman with three sisters who are played by Tereza Kostková, Veronika Khek Kubařová and Jenovéfa Boková.

At the moment she can be found at Theatre Studio DVA in several performances (Misery, Vzpomínky zůstanou,...).

Selected filmography
The Young Man and Moby Dick (1979)
Love Between the Raindrops (1979)
The Prince & The Evening Star (1979)
O vánoční hvězdě (2020)

External links
Biography (Czech)

References

1959 births
Living people
Czech stage actresses
Czech film actresses
Czech television actresses
Actresses from Prague
Czech voice actresses
20th-century Czech actresses
21st-century Czech actresses